Roman Hnativ (born 1 November 1973) is a former Soviet and Ukrainian footballer and Ukrainian football coach who currently manages Karpaty Lviv U-19 team.

References

External links
 
 

1973 births
Living people
People from Chervonohrad
Soviet footballers
Ukrainian footballers
Ukrainian expatriate footballers
Expatriate footballers in Moldova
Expatriate footballers in Sweden
FC Karpaty Lviv players
FC Karpaty-2 Lviv players
FC Skala Stryi (1911) players
FC Haray Zhovkva players
FC Torpedo Zaporizhzhia players
FC Dynamo Lviv players
FC Metalist Kharkiv players
FC Metalist-2 Kharkiv players
FC Hoverla Uzhhorod players
FC Nistru Otaci players
Ukrainian Premier League players
Ukrainian First League players
Ukrainian Second League players
Ukrainian football managers
FC Skala Stryi (2004) managers
Ukraine under-21 international footballers
Association football midfielders
FC Karpaty Lviv managers
FC Karpaty Halych managers
Sportspeople from Lviv Oblast